The  is a botanical garden operated by the Faculty of Agriculture, Kagoshima University. It is located at 1291 Ju-cho, Ibusuki, Kagoshima, Japan.

The garden contains useful plants of tropical and subtropical origin for student education and genetic conservation. Its site is of particular interest due to its mild climate and abundant supply of hot spring water from nearby volcanic activities.

See also 
 List of botanical gardens in Japan

References 
 General Information, Faculty of Agriculture, Kagoshima University
 List of the Woody Plants in the Botanical Garden of the Faculty of Agriculture, Kagoshima University, revised on 2003

Botanical gardens in Japan
Gardens in Kagoshima Prefecture
Ibusuki, Kagoshima